Montescardia is a genus of moths belonging to the family Tineidae.

The species of this genus are found in Europe and Northern America.

Species:
 Montescardia fuscofasciella (Chambers, 1875) 
 Montescardia kurenzovi (Zagulajev, 1966) 
 Montescardia tessulatellus (Zeller, 1846)

References

Tineidae
Tineidae genera